Ernie McCullough (3 December 1925 – 21 July 2015) was a Canadian sprinter. He competed in the men's 400 metres at the 1948 Summer Olympics.

References

1925 births
2015 deaths
Athletes (track and field) at the 1948 Summer Olympics
Canadian male sprinters
Olympic track and field athletes of Canada
Athletes from Calgary